Xu Haiqiao (born 17 April 1983), also known as Joe Xu, is a Chinese actor. He is best known for his roles in television series The Dream Of Red Mansions, The Journey of Flower, Revive, Detective Samoyeds, and Lost Love in Times. He graduated from Shanghai Theatre Academy.

Filmography

Film

Television series

Discography

Awards and nominations

References

External links

Living people
1983 births
Chinese male television actors
Chinese male film actors
21st-century Chinese male actors
Male actors from Jinan
Shanghai Theatre Academy alumni